Samuel David Alexander Brodie (born April 14, 1987) is a television presenter and actor who has appeared in Indonesian movies and soap operas.  He was born in Medan to Emmy Liana and Robin Barclay Brodie. He is publicly known for changing his gender into a woman and participating in the Big Brother reality show as Samantha Brodie. However, a few years later Brodie decided to return to his identity as a man. He married his wife Indry in 2010 and they had two daughters, Kimmy Caitlin Malika (born 2011) and Emmily Claire Luloah (born 2016).

Filmography

Book

References

External links 

1988 births
Living people
Indo people
Javanese people
Moluccan people
Indonesian people of Scottish descent
Indonesian male film actors
Converts to Islam from Christianity
Indonesian former Christians
Indonesian Muslims
People who detransitioned